"Baarish" is a Hindi song from the film Half Girlfriend. It is written by Arafat Mehmood and Tanishk Bagchi, and composed by Tanishk Bagchi. It is sung by Ash King.

Background
According to a report by the Hindustan Times newspaper, singer Jubin Nautiyal claimed he had recorded the song and was shocked when he realized his version was not retained. Reacting to the statement, composer Tanishk Bagchi said they had recorded the song with many singers but found Ash King's version to be the most suitable for the film.

Release and response
It was released on 11 April 2017 by Zee Music Company on YouTube. The recording by Ash King was well received; within a few days of its release, the music video garnered 10 million views on YouTube.

As of August 2017, the official music video of the song has garnered 120 million views on YouTube, making it one of the most streamed Hindi/Bollywood music videos on YouTube. It has garnered over 136 million views as of August 2020.

Baarish reached number one on the Pinkvilla chart.

Critical reception
Times of India reviewed the song as the monsoon song of the year for all those romantic at heart.

India.com in its review wrote: "The composers have used Santoor in the song which gives us the feel of rain. Santoor is the only instrument that gives us the feel of nature and happiness within seconds and the effect is clearly visible in this song too. The lyrics is quite catchy in the main verse and compels us to hum it However, the stanzas are a bit boring and we need to hear it a couple of times to fit it into our minds. Singers Ash King & Shashaa Tirupati have done a wonderful job. The song is composed by Tanishk Bagchi and written by Arafat Mehmood & Tanishk Bagchi again".

The song received mixed reviews by the Daily News and Analysis, which wrote: "The song’s lyrics, which are written by Arafat Mehmood and Tanishk Bagchi, are nothing beyond mediocre. And it is surprising because both of them have done some incredible work in the past. It reminds us of the strong connection between Shraddha and rains, they have been almost inseparable in all her films. We literally cannot think of a movie without a rain song picturised on Shraddha. What's also amusing is the fact that she is under the rain but for most part of the song, she doesn't get wet. Are you serious?
This song is definitely not the best work of director Mohit Suri, who has musical hits like Aashiqui 2 and Ek Villain to his credit. But we are sure it would become one of your favorites, especially if you are friendzoned or in a one-sided relationship."

Charts

Weekly charts

Year-end charts

Credits and personnel
Vocals – Ash King and Shashaa Tirupati
Music – Tanishk Bagchi
Lyrics – Arafat Mehmood and Tanishk Bagchi
Guitars – Mayukh Sarkar and Tanishk Bagchi 
Santoor – Prashant
Violins – Manas
Mixing and mastering – Eric Pillai (Future Sound of Bombay)
Assistant mixing engineers – Michael Edwin Pillai and Lucky
Programming – Tanishk Bagchi and Shamita (Team Acid)

Awards and nominations

References

2017 songs
Songs written for films
Hindi film songs
Ash King songs
Atif Aslam songs
Songs with lyrics by Arafat Mehmood
Songs written by Tanishk Bagchi